Blidingia dawsonii is a species of seaweed from a family of Ulvaceae that can be found in Canada (British Columbia), Mexico, and US states such as California and Washington. It was described by Hollenberg & I.A.Abbott in 1968. The species are disputed over genus, which some believe to be Percursaria.

References

Ulvales